Mudslide is a colloquial term for mudflow, the most rapid and fluid type of earth movement.

Mudslide may also refer to:

 Mudslide (EP), a 2000 EP by The Bluetones
 "Mudslide" (Batman: The Animated Series), a 1993 episode of Batman: The Animated Series
 Mudslide, a variation of a  White Russian cocktail
 "Mudslide", a song by Guys All-Star Shoe Band from A Prairie Home Companion soundtrack.